Alessandro Abruscia (born 12 July 1990) is an Italian-German footballer who plays for VfR Aalen as a midfielder.

References

External links

1990 births
Living people
German people of Italian descent
People from Waiblingen
Sportspeople from Stuttgart (region)
Association football midfielders
German footballers
Italian footballers
TSG 1899 Hoffenheim II players
Stuttgarter Kickers players
Stuttgarter Kickers II players
TSV 1860 Munich players
SSV Ulm 1846 players
3. Liga players
Regionalliga players
Footballers from Baden-Württemberg